The angular momentum of light is a vector quantity that expresses the amount of dynamical rotation present in the electromagnetic field of the light. While traveling approximately in a straight line, a beam of light can also be rotating (or "spinning, or "twisting) around its own axis.  This rotation, while not visible to the naked eye, can be revealed by the interaction of the light beam with matter.

There are two distinct forms of rotation of a light beam, one involving its polarization and the other its wavefront shape. These two forms of rotation are therefore associated with two distinct forms of angular momentum, respectively named light spin angular momentum (SAM) and light orbital angular momentum (OAM).

The total angular momentum of light (or, more generally, of the electromagnetic field and the other force fields) and matter is conserved in time.

Introduction 

Light, or more generally an electromagnetic wave, carries not only energy but also momentum, which is a characteristic property of all objects in translational motion. The existence of this momentum becomes apparent in the "radiation pressure phenomenon, in which a light beam transfers its momentum to an absorbing or scattering object, generating a mechanical pressure on it in the process.

Light may also carry angular momentum, which is a property of all objects in rotational motion. For example, a light beam can be rotating around its own axis while it propagates forward. Again, the existence of this angular momentum can be made evident by transferring it to small absorbing or scattering particles, which are thus subject to an optical torque.

For a light beam, one can usually distinguish two "forms of rotation, the first associated with the dynamical rotation of the electric and magnetic fields around the propagation direction, and the second with the dynamical rotation of light rays around the main beam axis. These two rotations are associated with two forms of angular momentum, namely SAM and OAM. However this distinction becomes blurred for strongly focused or diverging beams, and in the general case only the total angular momentum of a light field can be defined. An important limiting case in which the distinction is instead clear and unambiguous is that of a "paraxial light beam, that is a well collimated beam in which all light rays (or, more precisely, all Fourier components of the optical field) only form small angles with the beam axis.

For such a beam, SAM is strictly related with the optical polarization, and in particular with the so-called circular polarization. OAM is related with the spatial field distribution, and in particular with the wavefront helical shape.

In addition to these two terms, if the origin of coordinates is located outside the beam axis, there is a third angular momentum contribution obtained as the cross-product of the beam position and its total momentum. This third term is also called "orbital,  because it depends on the spatial distribution of the field. However, since its value is dependent from the choice of the origin, it is termed "external orbital angular momentum, as opposed to the "internal OAM appearing for helical beams.

Mathematical expressions for the angular momentum of light 
One commonly used expression for the total angular momentum of an electromagnetic field is the following one, in which there is no explicit distinction between the two forms of rotation:

However, another expression of the angular momentum naturally arising from Noether’s theorem is the following one, in which there are two separate terms that may be associated with SAM and OAM:

where  is the vector potential of the magnetic field, and the i-superscripted symbols denote the cartesian components of the corresponding vectors.

These two expressions can be proved to be equivalent to each other for any electromagnetic field that vanishes fast enough outside a finite region of space. The two terms in the second expression however are physically ambiguous, as they are not gauge-invariant.

A justification for taking this step is yet to be provided. The latter expression has further problems, as it can be shown that the two terms are not true angular momenta as they do not obey the correct quantum commutation rules. Their sum, that is the total angular momentum, instead does.

An equivalent but simpler expression for a monochromatic wave of frequency ω, using the complex notation for the fields, is the following:

Let us now consider the paraxial limit, with the beam axis assumed to coincide with the z axis of the coordinate system. In this limit the only significant component of the angular momentum is the z one, that is the angular momentum measuring the light beam rotation around its own axis, while the other two components are negligible.

where  and  denote the left and right circular polarization components, respectively.

Exchange of spin and orbital angular momentum with matter 

When a light beam carrying nonzero angular momentum impinges on an absorbing particle, its angular momentum can be transferred on the particle, thus setting it in rotational motion. This occurs both with SAM and OAM. However, if the particle is not at the beam center the two angular momenta will give rise to different kinds of rotation of the particle. SAM will give rise to a rotation of the particle around its own center, i.e., to a particle spinning. OAM, instead, will generate a revolution of the particle around the beam axis. These phenomena are schematically illustrated in the figure.

In the case of transparent media, in the paraxial limit, the optical SAM is mainly exchanged with anisotropic systems, for example birefringent crystals. Indeed, thin slabs of birefringent crystals are commonly used to manipulate the light polarization. Whenever the polarization ellipticity is changed, in the process, there is an exchange of SAM between light and the crystal. If the crystal is free to rotate, it will do so. Otherwise, the SAM is finally transferred to the holder and to the Earth.

Spiral Phase Plate (SPP) 

In the paraxial limit, the OAM of a light beam can be exchanged with material media that have a transverse spatial inhomogeneity. For example, a light beam can acquire OAM by crossing a spiral phase plate, with an inhomogeneous thickness (see figure).

Pitch-Fork Hologram 

A more convenient approach for generating OAM is based on using diffraction on a fork-like or pitchfork hologram (see figure). Holograms can be also generated dynamically under the control of a computer by using a spatial light modulator.

Q-Plate 

Another method for generating OAM is based on the SAM-OAM coupling that may occur in a medium which is both anisotropic and inhomogeneous. In particular, the so-called q-plate is a device, currently realized using liquid crystals, polymers or sub-wavelength gratings, which can generate OAM by exploiting a SAM sign-change. In this case, the OAM sign is controlled by the input polarization.

Cylindrical Mode Converters 

OAM can also be generated by converting a Hermite-Gaussian beam into a Laguerre-Gaussian one by using an astigmatic system with two well-aligned cylindrical lenses placed at a specific distance (see figure) in order to introduce a well-defined relative phase between horizontal and vertical Hermite-Gaussian beams.

Possible applications of the orbital angular momentum of light 
The applications of the spin angular momentum of light are undistinguishable from the innumerable applications of the light polarization and will not be discussed here. The possible applications of the orbital angular momentum of light are instead currently the subject of research. In particular, the following applications have been already demonstrated in research laboratories, although they have not yet reached the stage of commercialization:
 Orientational manipulation of particles or particle aggregates in optical tweezers
 High-bandwidth information encoding in free-space optical communication
 Higher-dimensional quantum information encoding, for possible future quantum cryptography or quantum computation applications
 Sensitive optical detection

See also 

 Angular momentum
 Circular polarization
 Electromagnetic wave
 Helmholtz equation
 Light
 Light orbital angular momentum
 Light spin angular momentum
 Optical vortices
 Orbital angular momentum multiplexing
 Polarization (waves)
 Photon polarization

References

External links 
 Phorbitech
 Glasgow Optics Group
 Leiden Institute of Physics
 ICFO
 Università Di Napoli "Federico II" 
 Università Di Roma "La Sapienza"
 University of Ottawa

Further reading
 
 
 

Angular momentum of light
Light